Martin County is a county in the U.S. state of Indiana. As of the 2020 United States Census, the population was 10,327. The county seat is Shoals at the center of the county, and the county's only incorporated city is Loogootee, on the county's western border.

History
The Indiana Territory achieved statehood near the end of 1816. Shortly thereafter, the new State legislature created Dubois (December 1817) and Daviess (February 1818) counties. Due to the inflow of settlers into southwest Indiana, and the difficulty of accessing the county seats of those counties, Martin County was partitioned off from parts of those counties, being authorized on 20 January 1820. It was named for Maj. John T. Martin of Newport, Kentucky.

Geography
The hills of Martin County are largely wooded and cut with drainages; the available area is devoted to agriculture, development, or is under control of the US Government - about a third of the county belongs to the Naval Surface Warfare Center Crane Division, and about a quarter of the county belongs to Hoosier National Forest. The highest point ( ASL) is in Mitcheltree Township, within NSWC Crane.

The East Fork of the White River flows southwestward through the lower part of the county. The central part of the county is drained by Indian Creek, which discharges into White River near the center of the county. The upper part of the county is drained by Boggs Creek, which discharges into White River near the county's western edge.

Adjacent counties

 Greene County - north
 Lawrence County - east
 Orange County - southeast
 Dubois County - south
 Daviess County - west

Protected areas
 Hoosier National Forest (part) in northeast and southeast parts of Martin County. Administered by US Forest Service
 Martin State Forest - in eastern part of Martin County. Administered by Indiana Department of Natural Resources

Lakes
 Greenwood Lake
 Seed Tick Lake
 West Boggs Lake (part)

Highways

  U.S. Route 50
  U.S. Route 150
  U.S. Route 231
  State Road 450
  State Road 550
  State Road 650

City and towns
 Crane
 Loogootee (city)
 Shoals

Unincorporated communities

 Bramble
 Burns City (census-designated place)
 Cale
 Dover Hill (census-designated place)
 Hindostan Falls
 Indian Springs
 Ironton
 Lacy
 Mount Olive
 Mount Pleasant
 Natchez
 Padanaram
 Pleasant Valley
 Rusk
 Scenic Hill
 Shoals Overlook
 South Martin
 Trinity Springs
 Whitfield
 Willow Valley
 Windom
 Yenne

Townships

 Center
 Halbert
 Lost River
 Mitcheltree
 Perry
 Rutherford

Climate and weather

Government

The county government is a constitutional body, and is granted specific powers by the Constitution of Indiana, and by the Indiana Code.

County Council: The legislative branch of the county government; controls spending and revenue collection in the county. Representatives are elected to four-year terms from county districts. They are responsible for setting salaries, the annual budget, and special spending. The council has limited authority to impose local taxes, in the form of an income and property tax that is subject to state level approval, excise taxes, and service taxes.

Board of Commissioners: The executive body of the county; commissioners are elected county-wide to staggered four-year terms. One commissioner serves as president. The commissioners execute the acts legislated by the council, collect revenue, and manage the county government.

Court: The county maintains a small claims court that handles civil cases. The judge on the court is elected to a term of four years and must be a member of the Indiana Bar Association. The judge is assisted by a constable who is also elected to a four-year term. In some cases, court decisions can be appealed to the state level circuit court.

County Officials: The county has other elected offices, including sheriff, coroner, auditor, treasurer, recorder, surveyor, and circuit court clerk. Officers are elected to four-year terms. Members elected to county government positions are required to declare party affiliations and to be residents of the county.

Martin County is part of Indiana's 8th congressional district; Indiana Senate district 39; and Indiana House of Representatives districts 62 and 63.

Political Culture

Education

Demographics

2010 Census
As of the 2010 United States Census, there were 10,334 people, 4,216 households, and 2,832 families in the county. The racial makeup of the county was 98.4% white, 0.3% Asian, 0.3% American Indian, 0.1% black or African American, 0.2% from other races, and 0.7% from two or more races. Those of Hispanic or Latino origin made up 0.7% of the population. In terms of ancestry, 27.8% were German, 19.2% were Irish, 14.9% were English, and 12.7% were American.

Of the 4,216 households, 30.5% had children under the age of 18 living with them, 52.8% were married couples living together, 9.2% had a female householder with no husband present, 32.8% were non-families, and 28.7% of all households were made up of individuals. The average household size was 2.43 and the average family size was 2.98. The median age was 41.8 years.

The median income for a household in the county was $47,697 and the median income for a family was $55,017. Males had a median income of $41,411 versus $30,503 for females. The per capita income for the county was $21,750. About 8.6% of families and 13.0% of the population were below the poverty line, including 21.2% of those under age 18 and 9.1% of those age 65 or over.

See also
 National Register of Historic Places listings in Martin County, Indiana

References

 
Indiana counties
1820 establishments in Indiana
Populated places established in 1820
Southwestern Indiana
Sundown towns in Indiana